This is a list of fighter aces in World War II from Canada. For other countries see List of World War II aces by country

A

B

C

D

E

F

G

H

I

J

K

L

M

N

O

P

R

S

T

U

W 
 -

Z

Notes

Abbreviations
 "KIA" in Notes means Killed in action (dates are included where possible).
 "KIFA" in Notes means Killed in Flying Accident.
 "MIA" in Notes means Missing in action. 
 "WIA" in Notes means Wounded in action leading to death which, in some cases, may have occurred months later.
 "POW" in Notes means Prisoner of War.
 "FAA" in Notes denotes that the person served with the Fleet Air Arm, rather than with the Royal Air Force.
 "Battle of Britain" in Notes denotes that the person flew during the Battle of Britain and were awarded the Battle of Britain Clasp to the 1939-1945 Star by flying at least one authorised operational sortie with an eligible unit of the Royal Air Force or Fleet Air Arm during the period from 0001 hours on 10 July to 2359 hours 31 October 1940.  See List of RAF aircrew in the Battle of Britain

Awards

References

External links
Canadian Aces of WW2
RCAF.com
RCAF Personnel Records 1939-45
RCAF: Canadians in Allied Flying Services

Canada
World War II flying aces